Gabriel Kobylak (born 20 February 2002) is a Polish professional footballer who plays as a goalkeeper for Ekstraklasa side Radomiak Radom, on loan from Legia Warsaw II.

Career statistics

Club

Honours
Individual
Ekstraklasa Young Player of the Month: February 2023

References

External links

2002 births
Living people
Polish footballers
Association football goalkeepers
Karpaty Krosno players
Legia Warsaw II players
Puszcza Niepołomice players
Radomiak Radom players
III liga players
I liga players
Ekstraklasa players
Poland youth international footballers